Edgar Schiferli (born 17 May 1976) is a former Dutch cricketer. He is a right-handed batsman and a right-handed medium-fast bowler.

International career
Schiferli was part of the Netherlands squad who were runners-up at the Denmark European Cup in 1996. Prior to the Cricket World Cup he spent three months in South Africa, honing his cricketing skills, and played during the 2002 Six Nations Challenge in Namibia.
In 2009 he won the award for best player in the 2009 ICC World Cup Qualifying competition.

Sources
 

1976 births
Living people
Dutch cricketers
Netherlands One Day International cricketers
Netherlands Twenty20 International cricketers
Sportspeople from The Hague